Mark Adams (born 1949) is one of New Zealand's most distinguished photographers.

He was born in Christchurch, New Zealand, and attended the Canterbury University School of Fine Arts from 1967–1970, majoring in graphic design to get access to photography.

I learned bugger all at art school. Tom Palaskas, a fellow student, taught me how to develop film and print. I taught myself how to use cameras. Then I discovered the art schools 4 x 5-inch Linhof plate camera and taught myself how to use that. That changed everything. That was the future.

After art school Adams became interested in painting through a long-term friendship with the artist Tony Fomison and later Theo Schoon.

Best known for his work on documenting Samoan tatau (tattooing), Maori-Pakeha interactions around Rotorua, and historic sites around New Zealand, Adam's work has been extensively exhibited within New Zealand as well as Europe, Australia and South Africa. His work has also featured in Brazil's São Paulo biennale.

In 1997 Adams was awarded the Southland Art Foundation Artist in Residence award.

His work is represented in most of New Zealand's major art institutions, including the Auckland Art Gallery Toi o Tamaki, Museum of New Zealand Te Papa Tongarewa and Christchurch Art Gallery.

In 2009, his photographs featured in a new book Tatau: Samoan Tattoo, New Zealand Art, Global Culture published by Te Papa Press, the publication arm of New Zealand's national museum. The book tells the story of Samoan master tattooist, the late Sua Sulu'ape Paulo II.

Adams lived for many years in Auckland, New Zealand where he has also taught photography.

Publications
Tatau: Samoan Tattoo, New Zealand Art, Global Culture (2009), published by Te Papa Press, Photographs by Mark Adams, edited by Sean Mallon and Nicholas Thomas.
Rauru: Tene Waitere, Maori Carving, Colonial History (8 July 2009), ASIN 1877372617, published by Otago University Press, Photographs by Mark Adams, James Schuster, Lyonel Grant, edited by Nicholas Thomas.
Cook's Sites: Revisiting History (1 Jan 1999), illustrated edition published by Otago University Press, Photographs by Mark Adams, edited by Nicholas Thomas.
Land of memories : a contemporary view of places of historical significance in the South Island of New Zealand (1993), published by Tandem Press, Photographs by Mark Adams, text by Harry Evison.

Further reading
Brownson, Ron, ed. Art Toi: New Zealand Art at Auckland Art Gallery Toi o Tamaki. Auckland: Auckland Art Gallery, 2011.
Corson-Scott, Chris & Edward Hanfling. Pictures They Want to Make: Recent Auckland Photography. Auckland: Photoforum, 2013.
Eggleton, David. Into the Light: A History of New Zealand Photography. Nelson: Craig Potton Publishing, 2006.
McAloon, William, ed. Art at Te Papa. Wellington: Te Papa Press, 2009.
Scott, Hanna & Ann Shelton eds. Sightseeeing. Auckland: Rim Books, 2010.
Strongman, Lara, ed. Contemporary New Zealand Photographers. Auckland: Mountain View, 2005.

Key Exhibitions
Kinder's Presence, Auckland Art Gallery Toi o Tamaki, 2013–14.
Recent Auckland Photography, Northart, Auckland, 2013.
Mark Adams, Bruce Connew, John Miller, Govett-Brewster Art Gallery, New Plymouth, 2009.
Tatau, Museum of Anthropology, University of British Columbia, Vancouver; OCAD Gallery, University of Ontario, Toronto, 2008.
Pe'a: Photographs by Mark Adams, Auckland Art Gallery Toi o Tamaki, 2005.
After William Hodges: Mark Adams Photographs, Auckland Art Gallery Toi o Tamaki, 2005.
Mark Adams, Zelda Cheatle Gallery, London, 2004.
Cook's Sites: Revisiting History, Museum of New Zealand Te Papa Tongarewa, 1999.
Roteiros. Roteiros. Roteiros. Roteiros. Roteiros. Roteiros. Roteiros, Fundacao Bienal de São Paulo, Brazil, XXIV Bienal de São Paulo, 1998.
Whenua I Maharatia, Hae hae Ngā Tākata – Land of Memories, Scarred by People, Dunedin Public Art Gallery; City Gallery Wellington, 1993–94.
After the Fact and Silence: Haruhiko Sameshima and Mark Adams, Lopdell House Gallery, Auckland, 1993.
Pākehā-Māori: A Conjuncture, Rotorua City Art Gallery (touring), 1986–1990.

Interviews
Chapter and Verse – Tatau, Broadcast Sunday 25 April 2010 on Radio New Zealand National (8'23")

References

External links
 Works at Auckland Art Gallery Toi o Tamaki
 Works at the Museum of New Zealand Te Papa Tongarewa
 The Marti Friedlander Photographic Award
 The Arts Foundation

21st-century New Zealand male artists
20th-century New Zealand photographers
1949 births
Living people
20th-century New Zealand male artists
21st-century New Zealand photographers